The discography of American hip hop artist Slaine, consists of five studio albums, one extended play and five mixtapes. His music has been released on labels such as Leedz Edutainment and Suburban Noize Records.

Albums

Studio albums

Collaborations

Extended plays

Mixtapes

Guest appearances

Music Videos

References

Slaine
Slaine